Shackled  may refer to:
 Shackled (1918 film), a silent American film
 Shackled (2012 British film), a short British film
 Shackled (2012 Indonesian film), an Indonesian horror film

See also
 Shackle (disambiguation)
 "Shackled and Drawn", a track from Wrecking Ball (Bruce Springsteen album)
 Shackled City, a role-playing game Adventure Path designed for Dungeons & Dragons